The canton of Saint-Omer-Sud is a former canton situated in the department of the Pas-de-Calais and in the Nord-Pas-de-Calais region of northern France. It was disbanded following the French canton reorganisation which came into effect in March 2015. It had a total of 21,597 inhabitants (2012).

Geography 
The canton is organised around Saint-Omer in the arrondissement of Saint-Omer. The altitude varies from 0m (Saint-Omer) to 119m (Wizernes) for an average altitude of 38m.

The canton comprised 4 communes:
Longuenesse
Saint-Omer (partly)
Tatinghem
Wizernes

See also 
Cantons of Pas-de-Calais 
Communes of Pas-de-Calais 
Arrondissements of the Pas-de-Calais department

References

Saint-Omer-Sud
Saint-Omer
2015 disestablishments in France
States and territories disestablished in 2015